Chipo Tsodzo (born 6 May 1976) is a retired Zimbabwean football defender.

References

1976 births
Living people
Zimbabwean footballers
Zimbabwe international footballers
Masvingo United F.C. players
Highlanders F.C. players
Mwana Africa F.C. players
Zimbabwe Saints F.C. players
Association football defenders